The Territory of Papua and New Guinea competed at the 1962 British Empire and Commonwealth Games in Perth, Western Australia, from 22 November to 1 December 1962.

Medalists

Athletics

Men
Track events

Field events

References

1962
Nations at the 1962 British Empire and Commonwealth Games
British Empire and Commonwealth Games